Herbert Ehrenberg (21 December 1926 – 20 February 2018) was a German politician.

Ehrenberg was born in Kollnischken, East Prussia (today Kolniszki, Poland) and visited school (Staatliche Kantschule) in Goldap until 1943, when he was conscripted to the Wehrmacht. After his release as Prisoner of war in 1947 he passed his Abitur and studied national economy in Wilhelmshaven and at the University of Göttingen, where he took his doctorate in 1958.

Ehrenberg joined the Public Services, Transport and Traffic Union (ÖTV) in 1949 and the Social Democratic Party of Germany, or SPD, in 1955. In 1964 he became the head of the national economy branch at the chairman of IG Bau-Steine-Erden-Union and in 1968 he started to work at the Federal Ministry of economics. In 1969 he switched to the German Chancellery and was a Secretary of State at the Federal Ministry of Labour and Social Affairs (Germany) in 1971–72 and its Minister in 1976–82.

Ehrenberg was the Vice-President of the Social Democratic Fraction in the Bundestag in 1974–1976 and a member of the Federal Executive Board of the SPD in 1975–1984. In 1997–2001 he was the Chairman of the Honorary Executive Board and in 2001–2003 the first President of the Internationaler Bund Freier Träger der Jugend-, Sozial- und Bildungsarbeit, afterwards its Honorary President. Ehrenberg died on 20 February 2018 at the age of 91.

References

1926 births
2018 deaths
German prisoners of war in World War II
Knights Commander of the Order of Merit of the Federal Republic of Germany
Labor ministers (Germany)
Members of the Bundestag for Lower Saxony
People from East Prussia
People from Gołdap County
Social Affairs ministers of Germany
University of Göttingen alumni
Members of the Bundestag for the Social Democratic Party of Germany
Members of the Bundestag 1987–1990
Members of the Bundestag 1983–1987
Members of the Bundestag 1980–1983
Members of the Bundestag 1976–1980
Members of the Bundestag 1972–1976